The CEO Dancers is a London-based trio of female dancers and choreographers who rose to recognition following their performance at Britain's Got Talent 2013 which saw them reach the semi-final of the competition.

Background
Formed during their university days, the group is made up of Ezinne Asinugo, Soliat Bada and Nqobilé Ntshangase. In 2013, the group auditioned for the seventh series  of Britain's Got Talent and went on to reach the semi-final following performances that left Simon Cowell impressed, thereby increasing the group's fanbase with Metro'''s Seamus Duff listing them at #5 on his list of "Britain’s Got Talent’s Top 10
Sexiest Acts". The CEO Dancers have worked with the likes of Rihanna, Drake, Wizkid, Davido, D'Banj, Stefflon Don, Iyanya, Awilo Longomba, Tiwa Savage, P-Square among other notable acts.

Artistry
Dance style
Their main style of dance originates from Africa. Individually their styles range from Street Dance, Vogueing, Contemporary to Dancehall.

Influences
The group credit their major inspirations from classic artists like Fela to modern contemporary artists like Fally Ipupa.

Film appearance
In 2016, Ezinne and Soliat made guest appearances in the dance film The Dance Movie Project'' which premiered on 23 July 2016.

Awards and nominations

References

Dance groups